Made Me Do It (also known as The Haunted Made Me Do It) is the second studio album by Swedish metal band The Haunted, released on 30 June 2000. It was re-released in 2001 with the live album Live Rounds in Tokyo as a bonus CD.

Interview with EvilG of Metal Rules

Album cover 
When asked about why the cover is a collage of serial killers, part of the band replied:

When asked about who were on the Cover, part of the band replied again:

Other notable mentions on the cover are Ted Kaczynski, Albert Fish.

Title 
When asked about Title, part of the band replied again:

Writing 
When asked about Writing, Per replied:

Track listing 

Limited edition bonus CD
Bonus track

Bonus disc

Reception 
In 2005, Made Me Do It was ranked number 461 in Rock Hard magazine's book of The 500 Greatest Rock & Metal Albums of All Time.

Credits

The Haunted 
 Marco Aro – vocals, lyrics on disc 1: tracks 2, 4, 7, 8, 10 & 11.
 Anders Björler – lead guitar, mixing, music on disc 1: tracks 2, 3, 4, 5, 6, 7, 10 & 11
 Patrik Jensen – rhythm guitar, music on disc 1: tracks 1, 2, 4, 5, 8, 9 & 11
 Jonas Björler – bass, backing vocals, music on disc 1: tracks 2, 3, 5–8, 10 & 11
 Per Möller Jensen – drums, mixing

Additional personnel 
Andreas "Diaz" Pettersson – cover artwork, booklet design
Berno Paulsson – engineering, mixing
Henrik Larsson – assistant engineering
Henrik Witt – photography
Göran Finnberg – mastering
Adrian Erlandsson – lyrics on "Bullet Hole"

References 

2000 albums
The Haunted (Swedish band) albums
Melodic death metal albums
Earache Records albums